The Shapiro reaction or tosylhydrazone decomposition is an organic reaction in which a ketone or aldehyde is converted to an alkene through an intermediate hydrazone in the presence of 2 equivalents of organolithium reagent. The reaction was discovered by Robert H. Shapiro in 1967. The Shapiro reaction was used in the Nicolaou Taxol total synthesis. This reaction is very similar to the Bamford–Stevens reaction, which also involves the basic decomposition of tosyl hydrazones.

Reaction mechanism
In a prelude to the actual Shapiro reaction, a ketone or an aldehyde (1)  is reacted with p-toluenesulfonylhydrazide(2) to form a p-toluenesulfonylhydrazone (or tosylhydrazone) which is a hydrazone (3). Two equivalents of strong base such as n-butyllithium abstract the proton from the hydrazone (4) followed by the less acidic proton α to the hydrazone carbon (5), forming a carbanion. The carbanion then undergoes an elimination reaction producing a carbon–carbon double bond and ejecting the tosyl anion, forming a diazonium anion (6). This diazonium anion is then lost as molecular nitrogen resulting in a vinyllithium species (7), which can then be reacted with various electrophiles, including simple neutralization with water or an acid (8).

Scope
The position of the alkene in the product is controlled by the site of deprotonation by the organolithium base. In general, the kinetically favored, less substituted site of differentially substituted tosylhydrazones is deprotonated selectively, leading to the less substituted vinyllithium intermediate. Although many secondary reactions exist for the vinyllithium functional group, in the Shapiro reaction in particular water is added, resulting in protonation to the alkene. Other reactions of vinyllithium compounds include alkylation reactions with for instance alkyl halides.

Importantly, the Shapiro reaction cannot be used to synthesize 1-lithioalkenes (and the resulting functionalized derivatives), as sulfonylhydrazones derived from aldehydes undergo exclusive addition of the organolithium base to the carbon of the C–N double bond.

Catalytic Shapiro reaction
Traditional Shapiro reactions require stoichiometric (sometimes excess) amounts of base to generate the alkenyllithium reagents. To combat this problem, Yamamoto and coworkers developed an efficient stereoselective and regioselective route to alkenes using a combination of ketone phenylaziridinylhydrazones as arenesulfonylhydrazone equivalents with a catalytic amount of lithium amides.
The required phenylaziridinylhydrazone was prepared from the condensation of undecan-6-one with 1-amino-2-phenylaziridine. Treatment of the phenylaziridinylhydrazone with 0.3 equivalents of LDA in ether resulted in the alkene shown below with a cis:trans ratio of 99.4:0.6. The ratio was determined by capillary GLC analysis after conversion to the corresponding epoxides with mCPBA. The catalyst loading can be reduced to 0.05 equivalents in the case of a 30mmol scale reaction.

The high stereoselectivity is obtained by the preferential abstraction of the α-methylene hydrogen syn to the phenylaziridine, and is also accounted for by the internal chelation of the lithiated intermediated.

A one pot in situ combined Shapiro-Suzuki reaction
The Shapiro reaction can also be combined with the Suzuki reaction to produce a variety of olefin products. Keay and coworkers have developed methodology that combines these reactions in a one pot process that does not require the isolation of the boronic acid, a setback of the traditional Suzuki coupling. This reaction has a wide scope, tolerating a slew of trisylhydrazones and aryl halides, as well as several solvents and Pd sources.

An application of the Shapiro reaction in total synthesis
The Shapiro reaction has been used to generate olefins towards to complex natural products. K. Mori and coworkers wanted to determine the absolute configuration of the phytocassane group of a class of natural products called phytoalexins. This was accomplished by preparing the naturally occurring (–)-phytocassane D from (R)-Wieland-Miescher ketone. On the way to (–)-phytocassane D, a tricyclic ketone was subjected to Shapiro reaction conditions to yield the cyclic alkene product.

See also
Hydrazone iodination
Wolff–Kishner reduction

References

Carbon-carbon bond forming reactions
Olefination reactions
Organic redox reactions
Name reactions